Jil-Sophie Eckert (born 3 May 1996) is a German female canoeist who won two medals at senior level at the Wildwater Canoeing World Championships.

Medals at the World Championships
Senior

References

External links
 

1996 births
Living people
German female canoeists
Place of birth missing (living people)